Word Salad is a 1979 debut album by Fischer-Z. John Watts and Steve Skolnik formed the band in 1976 whilst at Brunel University. John Watts had been travelling up and down the country playing the club circuit. Fischer-Z was playing a crossover of the new wave, punk and reggae genres. In 1978, the band secured a record deal with United Artists, alongside the Buzzcocks, The Stranglers and Dr. Feelgood.

Track listing
All tracks composed by John Watts; except where noted.
"Pretty Paracetamol" (also known as: "First Impressions", but this name doesn't usually feature on the CD releases) – 3:57
"Acrobats" (Watts, David Graham) – 2:42
"The Worker" – 3:36
"Spiders" (Watts, Steve Skolnik) – 1:42
"Remember Russia" – 3:29
"The French Let Her" (Watts, Steve Skolnik) – 3:21
"Lies" – 3:57
"Wax Dolls" – 2:46
"Headlines" – 3:21
"Nice to Know" – 2:52
"Billy and the Motorway Police" (Watts, David Graham) – 2:11
"Lemmings" (Watts, Steve Skolnik) – 3:02

Personnel
Fischer-Z
John Watts - lead vocals, guitar
Steve Skolnik - keyboards, vocals
David Graham - bass guitar
Steve Liddle - drums, percussion
Technical
Gary Edwards, Aldo Bocca - recording engineer
John Pasche - art direction, design
John Wedge - photography

Notes
The songs "Wax Dolls", "Remember Russia", "The Worker" and "Pretty Paracetamol" (although named on single release as "First Impressions") were used as singles. "The Worker" being the most successful, hitting #53 on the UK charts (Note: The 7" single version of "The Worker" is slightly remixed from the album and emphasises the keyboards. This version has yet to appear on CD to date).
The album was first released on CD in 1989. In 1997 "Disky Communications Europe" re-released the album under the title "The Worker". It included two bonus tracks: "Limbo" and "Marliese"; the first appearing on Fischer-Z's second album Going Deaf For A Living, and the latter appearing on their third, Red Skies Over Paradise. In 2005, Disky re-released this version again, this time simply going by the title "Fischer-Z".

References

1979 debut albums
Fischer-Z albums
Albums produced by Mike Howlett
United Artists Records albums